Camp Alvernia is a non-profit recreational summer camp in Centerport, New York on the North Shore of Long Island. The camp is located on the east shore of Centerport Harbor, on the Little Neck peninsula. It was founded in 1888 by the Franciscan Brothers of Brooklyn, who still run the facility now, over 130 years later. Alvernia was the first and is now the oldest Catholic camp in continuous operation in the United States.

Camp Alvernia is currently a day camp that serves 800-900 children ages 3 to 14 from all religious backgrounds, and also continues to serve as a retreat for the Franciscan Brothers. The Camp offers boating and sailing activities, land and field activities, and swimming in four pools. Scholarships are also awarded each year to families in serious financial need.

Originally built as a summer retreat for Franciscan brothers, the  facility later became a residential camp for immigrant children living in New York City, who slept in tents until cabins were built in the 1930-40s. It was originally named "Mount Alvernia" after the mountain in Italy where Francis of Assisi is said to have received stigmata. Funding for the camp was raised by redeeming Kirkman Soap wrappers, each having a value of two cents.

Camp Alvernia was founded as a residential camp for boys. It was a co-ed sleep away and day camp as early as the 1980s (possibly earlier). Boys and girls, ages 5–18, could go for either 3- or 6-week periods of time. (Later changed to 2, 4, 6, or 8 week sessions) Girls traditionally stayed in the dorms attached to the main building, brother residences, and "dithe ning hall"; there was one room for younger girls, o ande room for older girls.  Bos stayed in traditional cabins with names such as Nes"Nest," ", Bayview, Shady Rest, St" "gecoach, and Sea"Seaside"cording to agetheir . There would be a weekly campfire for all sleep awy residents. Weekends hadoffere lot more freedom in actterms of ivities. At the time of its 100th anniversary, it was still run as a simultaneous residential and day camp.  Reidential students would be awoken by a reveille over the campus wide loudspeaker, meet for breakfast, and then break into their day camp groups, as the day campers would be bused in from local Long Island towns in vans.  

Keeping with the camp's theme and location, the day camp named its various age groups after tribes of the Iroquois nation. The youngest campers were called the Oneidas, followed by the Mohawk, Huron, Cayuga and the Senea.  The same names are used to this day, although the age groups they refer to have changd.  Cayugas are boys and girls who completedschoolre-k and kindergarten prior to the start of ;amp, Oneidas are 1st and 2nd graders, Mohawks are 3rd and 4th gra;ers, Hurons are 5th and 6th gra;ers, and Senecas are and 7th-9th graders. Historic,ally children were also further separated within their group designation as 'girls groups and' boys groups; throughout the, day there would be friendly competition within the designatiWn. within each particular age group, campers would be assigned to a particular number within their g;roup for inst,ance there was Seneca Girls 1, Seneca Girlsand  2, Seneca Gir.lA 3 a very detailed member of the administration team would assign a daily camp schedule for the day. The activities could include camper choice, soccer, tennis, boating, arts & crafts, dance, swimming, dodge ball, basketball, ping-pong, and for the little ones, many learned to swim for the first time at Camp Alvernia in addition to participation in age-appropriate aforementioned sports and age specific games like parachute, red rover, red-light green-light. In 2016, the camp began accepting t-ree -ear olds in a new age group called the Pequots.

Camp activities included traditional arts and crafts and swimming, but also had full sibask-tball courts, tennis courts, beach volleyball, soccer, softball, and playing fields.  Its speciaty was boating, especially windsurfing.  Campers wold have boating, led by the famous Brother Louie, as he gave an all-important safety talk followed by Q&A under the big shady tree on the sandy hill in front of the boat house. He would tell stories and educate all campers on the importance of their PFD - personals (otation device. This was s)a square orange life jacket. During the boating period, Brother Louie would name one of his boating specialty counselors skilled in sailing who would stand up, assign the counselor a vessel, and all that were interested in going with that counselor would raise their hands. Brother Louie would select the campers that would go with that counselor, and they would take off down the beach on their way. Lastly Brother Lo,uie would assign the typically age group counselors typically toh the campers not selected for sailing.  There weremany options for campers. They could canoe, kayak (post 2000), windsurf, sail (sunfish boats) or go on t,he few larger sailboats 1(boats for )asail ride.  Before 200, there would also be "field trips" excursios to the Commack roller skating rink, Vanderbilt the Museum in Centerport, the local arcade (on rainy days), and nearby beaches (Robert Moses for the older campers and Centerport for the younger campers). Another important nostalgic element of camp was the garage where camp,ers could visit the canteen, purchasin and purchase candyg soda,little favorites from pocketwithnge theimoneynts might give them throughout the week.

Before 2000, and the loss of records in the 1990s, it's important to note that the Franciscan brothers were a collaborate but competitive athletic group of mentors. Camp Alvernia had a competitive softball team that traveled several times a summer to play against other camps. By 1990 t,he all-boy softball team recognized female talent and opened paup rticipation up to a few female players (Tonya Cavallaro was their first female pitcher). Overall, the leaders of the camp, both Franciscan brothers and Cathe rol family d,id a great job engaging both female and male campers with athletic and non-athletic activities, encouraging participation, and recognizing all campers' accomplishments. They recognized participation in all activities during the day with an elaborate points system accompanied by an elaborate (manual) record keeping system (that was probably lost in the damage that was done as it was before the days of the internet and cloud). Points were awarded for any effort and participation c,alled "participation points".."ounselors were charged with record keeping each day handing in the point sheets. Campers could earn additional points if their particular group won at an assigned activity s,uch as soccer o,ver another group. For instance, Senaca Girls Group 1 VS. Senaca Girls Group 2. There was even mea thodology set out to give points for ties. This point system bonded the individual groups even further as they learned to play fairly, work together, build character, and win and lose graciously. Campers could also earn individual additional points if they placed in the camp marathon or pl track and field races among all campers of their particular age and gender. All campers would earn participation points for participating.

These points were cumulative over the course of the summer and impressively, year after year. There were milestoes awards for points over cumulative years. The highest recognition of points would be 16,000 A's which would earn the camper a plaque, recognition at the awards ceremony. Along the way, there were chevrons for milestones. This was arguably a great system because even thleamosonathletic camp,er over ti,me would earn these acknowledgements. This community spirit of cheering on others' various accomplishments was reinforced by the unique clapping syst:em every Alverian clap equaled two claps with a pauseIn the 1980s and 1990s, o One of the brothers, or camp director would typically MC'ed weekly awar0s. They would ask all to hold their applause until the e,nd and then depending on the age group and accomplishme,nt they would give those campers a respective number of Alvernians. So, they could ask for two and a half Alvernia,ns which would be clap-clap, pause, clap-clap, pause, clap. This would sound impressive coming from several hundred campers in a dome, garage, or even on a hillsi,de depending on where the awards ceremony was held that week.

Upon the conclusion of the summer there was excitement and anticipation building up to a full afternoon of awards to conclude the summer. There were awards for every area of camp activity specialty for boys and girls in every respective group from Mohawk all the way to Senaca in the form of a bronze, silver, aorgold metal ,including an overall best female and best male trophy in that category named after a Franciscan Brother. The award recipient was decided upon by the counselors in those respective age groups based on performance throughout the summer. There were categories like boating, arts & crafts, soccer, softball, tennis, swimming, and track & field. The annual awards ceremony for decades ended with camper/athlete of the year, typically awarded to a Senaca the oldest group, someone who was enrolled in the last session of the camp, and typically was there all summer. These were not necessarily requirements but obvious attributes of the winner.  These campers were nominated and voted on by all the counselors. There was great anticipation of who would win the prestigious title every year and typically the individuals that were the 12 runner ups and winners were campers of high drive and athleticism.

In the summer of 2000, Camp Alvernia developed a course called "Leadership Skills in Community Youth Recreation." The course was based in part on the camp's annual pre-camp orientation program, and participating camp counselors earn college credit. The Love of Learning Montessori method school moved to the grounds of Camp Alvernia in September 2004.

In the 1990s, many of the camp's records were thrown out, having suffered water damage.  In 2010, the camp began a concerted effort to reconnect with former campers and counselors.

In 2012, the camp built two new pools to provide additional space for recreational and instructional swim programs.  The camp also conducts a greatly expanded boating program, with paddle boats, canoes, kayaks, stand up paddleboards (SUPs), and sailboats.  The camp also offers a sailing certification program through US Sailing.

References

External links 
Official site

Huntington, New York
Buildings and structures in Suffolk County, New York